Vladislav Valeryevich Yefimov (born 8 October 1977, died 21 January 2015) was a Russian football striker.

Club career
He played most of his early career with FC Volochanin-Ratmir Vyshny Volochyok. In 1996, he signed with Russian Premier League club FC Torpedo-Luzhniki Moscow. In 1998, he moved abroad signing with Belgian club R.O.C. de Charleroi-Marchienne. In winter break of the season 1999-2000 he moved to Serbian club FK Sartid Smederevo playing in the First League of FR Yugoslavia. He still played with Hapoel Tzafririm Holon F.C. in the Israeli Premier League during the first half of 2011, before returning to Russia in summer 2001 to play one season with FC Lokomotiv Nizhny Novgorod in the Russian First League. Afterwards he played with second league clubs FC BSK Spirovo and FC Volga Tver.

Death
He was murdered during a robbery in 2015.

References

1977 births
People from Vyshny Volochyok
2015 deaths
People murdered in Russia
Russian footballers
Russian expatriate footballers
Association football forwards
FC Torpedo Moscow players
FC Torpedo-2 players
FC Lokomotiv Nizhny Novgorod players
Russian Premier League players
R. Olympic Charleroi Châtelet Farciennes players
Expatriate footballers in Belgium
FK Smederevo players
Expatriate footballers in Serbia and Montenegro
Hapoel Tzafririm Holon F.C. players
Expatriate footballers in Israel
Russian expatriate sportspeople in Israel
Russian expatriate sportspeople in Serbia and Montenegro
Russian murder victims
Male murder victims
Sportspeople from Tver Oblast